The Mohmand marble mine landslide happened on 7 September 2020. At least 18 people were killed and more than 20 people injured by a landslide at a marble mine in Mohmand District, Khyber Pakhtunkhwa, Pakistan.

References

2020 disasters in Pakistan
2020 in Khyber Pakhtunkhwa
2020 mining disasters
Disasters in Khyber Pakhtunkhwa
Landslides in 2020
Landslides in Pakistan
Mining disasters in Asia
Marble mine disaster
September 2020 events in Pakistan